SCIF may refer to:

 Sensitive compartmented information facility, an enclosure protecting United States secrets
 State Compensation Insurance Fund, a California government-owned workers' compensation insurer
 Safari Club International Foundation, the charitable arm of Safari Club International
 Symmetric Communication Interface, a low-level software library for memory and communication handling between a Xeon Phi Coprocessor and its host.
SCI Foundation, a non-profit initiative that works with governments in sub-Saharan African countries to develop sustainable programmes against parasitic worm infections

See also
 Skiff (disambiguation)